"Prinzesschen" (English: Little Princess) is a song written by Bob Arnz and Gerd Zimmermann and recorded by German singer LaFee. It was released as the second single from Lafee's debut album LaFee. An English version of the song, entitled "Little Princess", later appeared on LaFee's third studio album Shut Up.

Track listing
CD Maxi Single
 "Prinzesschen" - 4:28
 "Prinzesschen" (Club version) - 4:23
 "Prinzesschen" (Radio version) - 3:37
 "Verboten" - 3:48

Charts

Weekly charts

Year-end charts

References

2006 singles
LaFee songs
2006 songs
Songs written by Bob Arnz
EMI Records singles
Songs written by Gerd Zimmermann (songwriter)